is a Japanese football player. He plays for FC Ryukyu.

Playing career
Shunsuke Motegi joined to J1 League club; Vegalta Sendai in 2015. In July, he move to J2 League club; Zweigen Kanazawa. In 2016, he back to Vegalta Sendai.

Club statistics
Updated to 14 April 2020.

References

External links
Profile at Vegalta Sendai

1996 births
Living people
Association football people from Tokyo
Japanese footballers
J1 League players
J2 League players
J3 League players
Sendai University Meisei High School alumni
Vegalta Sendai players
Zweigen Kanazawa players
J.League U-22 Selection players
Mito HollyHock players
FC Ryukyu players
Association football midfielders